The 1952 Iowa State Teachers Panthers football team represented Iowa State Teachers College in the North Central Conference during the 1952 college football season. In its 15th season under head coach Clyde Starbeck, the team compiled a 5–2 record (5–1 against NCC opponents) and won the conference championship. The team played its home games at O. R. Latham Stadium in Cedar Falls, Iowa.

Six players won all-conference honors: halfback Bill Olson; fullback John Corey; center Lou Bohnsack; end Mahlon Kaylor; guard Karl Raush; and tackle Bud Rowray.

Schedule

References

Iowa State Teachers
Northern Iowa Panthers football seasons
North Central Conference football champion seasons
Iowa State Teachers Panthers football